The 1999 Nova Supersports Cup was an association football friendly tournament competition hosted by Greek premium sports network Nova Sports in 1999, held in Athens.

The tournament occurred from 31 July to 1 August 1999 with the participation of English Premier League club Leicester City, Hertha Berlin from the Bundesliga, Iraklis from the Alpha Ethniki and AEK Athens from the Alpha Ethniki, which eventually won the tournament.

Teams
The teams who accepted the invitations are:

  AEK Athens – Alpha Ethniki (host)
  Iraklis – Alpha Ethniki 
  Leicester City – Premier League
  Hertha Berlin – Bundesliga

Venue

All the games were played at the Nikos Goumas Stadium a 27,729 seat multi-use venue, home ground of hosts AEK Athens. The ground has been demolished in June 2003.

Games

Semi-finals

Consolation final

Final

Results

Scorers

References

Bibliography 
 Συλλογικό έργο (2014). 90 ΧΡΟΝΙΑ, Η ΙΣΤΟΡΙΑ ΤΗΣ ΑΕΚ . Αθήνα, Ελλάδα: Εκδοτικός Οίκος Α. Α. Λιβάνη. .
 Παναγιωτακόπουλος, Παναγιώτης (2021). 1963-2021 ΤΟ ΤΑΞΙΔΙ ΣΥΝΕΧΙΖΕΤΑΙ . Αθήνα, Ελλάδα: .
 Παναγιωτακόπουλος, Παναγιώτης (2022). 1979-2003 ΤΟ ΤΑΞΙΔΙ ΣΥΝΕΧΙΖΕΤΑΙ...Νο2 . Αθήνα, Ελλάδα: .

External links
 Supersport Tournament (Athinai) 1999-2001
 AEK Athens Fixtures of period 1999-2000
 Semi-finals Highlights
 AEK Athens-Hertha BSC Highlights

1999 establishments in Greece